Nyssodrysternum is a genus of beetles in the family Cerambycidae, containing the following species:

 Nyssodrysternum amparense (Melzer, 1934)
 Nyssodrysternum analogum Monne & Tavakilian, 2011
 Nyssodrysternum basale (Melzer, 1934)
 Nyssodrysternum bolivianum Monne & Tavakilian, 2011
 Nyssodrysternum borneanum (Breuning, 1970)
 Nyssodrysternum capixaba Monne & Tavakilian, 2011
 Nyssodrysternum caudatum (Bates, 1864)
 Nyssodrysternum cingillum Monne, 2009
 Nyssodrysternum colombianum Monne & Tavakilian, 2011
 Nyssodrysternum conspicillare (Erichson, 1847)
 Nyssodrysternum conspicuum Monné, 1985
 Nyssodrysternum cotopaxi Monne & Tavakilian, 2011
 Nyssodrysternum cretatum Monné, 1985
 Nyssodrysternum decoratum Monné, 1992
 Nyssodrysternum diopticum (Bates, 1864)
 Nyssodrysternum efflictum (Bates, 1864)
 Nyssodrysternum fasciatum Gilmour, 1960
 Nyssodrysternum flavoguttatum Monne & Tavakilian, 2011
 Nyssodrysternum flavolineatum Monné, 1985
 Nyssodrysternum freyorum (Gilmour, 1963)
 Nyssodrysternum fulminans (Bates, 1864)
 Nyssodrysternum gilvolineatum Monne & Tavakilian, 2011
 Nyssodrysternum gratum Monné, 1985
 Nyssodrysternum hovorei Monne & Tavakilian, 2011
 Nyssodrysternum impensum Monné, 1985
 Nyssodrysternum instabile Monné, 1992
 Nyssodrysternum insulorum Monne & Tavakilian, 2011
 Nyssodrysternum lanceolatum Monne & Tavakilian, 2011
 Nyssodrysternum laterale (Melzer, 1931)
 Nyssodrysternum lepidum Monné, 1992
 Nyssodrysternum lineolatum (Bates, 1864)
 Nyssodrysternum multilineatum Monne & Tavakilian, 2011
 Nyssodrysternum nitidum Monne & Tavakilian, 2011
 Nyssodrysternum ocellatum (Bates, 1885)
 Nyssodrysternum picticolle (Melzer, 1934)
 Nyssodrysternum pictulum (Bates, 1881)
 Nyssodrysternum plaumanni Monné, 1992
 Nyssodrysternum poriferum (Bates, 1885)
 Nyssodrysternum promeces (Bates, 1864)
 Nyssodrysternum propinquum (Bates, 1864)
 Nyssodrysternum proximum Monne & Tavakilian, 2011
 Nyssodrysternum ptericoptum (Bates, 1864)
 Nyssodrysternum reticulatum (Melzer, 1934)
 Nyssodrysternum rodens (Bates, 1864)
 Nyssodrysternum rubiginosum Monné, 1975
 Nyssodrysternum schmithi (Melzer, 1931)
 Nyssodrysternum serpentinum (Erichson, 1847)
 Nyssodrysternum signiferum (Bates, 1864)
 Nyssodrysternum simulatum (Bates, 1864)
 Nyssodrysternum spilotum Monné, 1975
 Nyssodrysternum stillatum (Bates, 1864)
 Nyssodrysternum striatellum (Tippmann, 1960)
 Nyssodrysternum sulphurescens (Bates, 1885)
 Nyssodrysternum taeniatum Monné, 1985
 Nyssodrysternum tucurui Monne & Tavakilian, 2011
 Nyssodrysternum univittis (Bates, 1885)
 Nyssodrysternum vanini Monne & Tavakilian, 2011
 Nyssodrysternum variabile Monné, 1985
 Nyssodrysternum zonatum Monné, 1985

References

 
Acanthocinini